Marek Gatty-Kostyal (born July 20, 1886 in Bochnia – September 13, 1965 in Kraków) was a Polish chemist and pharmacist, known for his many contributions to pharmaceutical science.

1886 births
1965 deaths
Polish chemists
Polish pharmacologists